The World Lacrosse Women's World Championship (WLWWC), formerly known as the Women's Lacrosse World Cup (WLWC), the international championship of women's lacrosse, is held every four years. From its inception in 1982, it was sponsored by the governing body for women's lacrosse, the International Federation of Women's Lacrosse Associations, until that body merged in 2008 with the former governing body for men's lacrosse. Since 2009, the WLWC has been sponsored by the sport's new unified governing body, the Federation of International Lacrosse. The 2017 Women's Lacrosse World Cup was held in Guildford, England, and was won by the United States over Canada by the score of 10-5.

History  

Four players took part in all of the first five editions of the Women's Lacrosse World Cup, Vivien Jones of Wales, Lois Richardson of England, and Sue Sofanos and Marge Barlow both of Australia.

Championship games

Medal table

Past results

See also 
 Men's World Lacrosse Championship
 Men's and Women's Under-19 World Lacrosse Championships

References

External links 
The 2009 FIL Women's World Cup web site

 
Women's world championships
Recurring sporting events established in 1982